Deh Khvajeh (also Romanized as Deh Khvājeh; also known as Deh Khājeh and Deh Khvājā) is a village in Siriz Rural District, Yazdanabad District, Zarand County, Kerman Province, Iran. At the 2006 census, its population was 552, in 134 families.

References 

Populated places in Zarand County